Sunny Brae may refer to:
Sunny Brae, California, an unincorporated community in Humboldt County, California
Sunny Brae, New Brunswick, a neighbourhood in Moncton, New Brunswick

See also
Sunnybrae (disambiguation)